Caronte is the Italian, Portuguese and Spanish name of Charon, the boatman of Hades, appearing in numerous versions of the legend of Orpheus:

Caronte in Caccini's Euridice
Caronte in Peri's Euridice
Caronte in Monteverdi's L'Orfeo
Caronte in Rossi's Orfeo
Caronte in Landi's La morte d'Orfeo.

It may also refer to:
Caronte, 1971 album by The Trip.
Caronte, 2020 Spanish television series.